A harness saddle is an element of horse harness which supports the weight of shafts or poles attaching a vehicle to a horse.  Like other types of saddle, it lies on the horse's back directly behind the withers, often has an internal supportive framework (referred to as a saddle tree), and usually is secured on either side by a girth passing beneath the horse.   Unlike riding saddles, it is an integral part of the harness and is not used as stand-alone equipment.

Manufacture

The harness saddle usually has a supportive internal structure, often called a harness saddle tree that is to be custom fitted to an individual horse, and has fittings (buckles, rings, etc.) for attachment of other pieces of harness.  The tree was traditionally made from a steel or iron plate  but in modern times can also be made of flexible plastic.

In the United States during the late 19th century, at the height of use of horse-drawn vehicles, a pre-fabricated tree and fittings could be ordered by a saddle maker and assembled to suit the user.  Many different trees, fittings, and assembly practices were patented.

Use
The harness saddle supports the weight of the shafts or pole, and in a two-wheeled vehicle, also supports part of the vehicle's weight.  In addition, it offers a base for fittings such as terrets and a point of attachment for a bearing rein.

A harness saddle is normally used on the horses next to the vehicle (in a team, the wheelers).  It may also be used for show on leaders in a team.

The saddle is held in position by a girth strapped firmly around the heartgirth area of the horse.  When traces are used, a back band runs through the saddle, joining at the sides to a loose strap under the belly, the 'belly band'; both attach to loops around the shafts or to a pole.  The back band may be fixed or it may be free to slide through the saddle from side to side; it is normally fixed for a four-wheeled vehicle with independently hinged shafts, but sliding for a vehicle with rigid shafts (such as a two-wheeled cart).  This allows the horse to twist in the shafts on a side-slope.

Certain designs of harness saddle have a groove in the top, into which fits a chain that is hooked to the shafts.  The belly band also hooks onto the shafts from beneath.

For display, a saddle pad may be placed beneath the saddle;  historically in England a saddle pad, also called "housing" or "saddle cloth", was shaped to match the contour of the saddle, in the manner of an English numnah today.

For heavy use, the saddle may be six or more inches long, front to back.  For very light use, saddle and girth may be replaced by a surcingle.

History

The harness saddle has at least two lines of evolution, both departures from the very ancient throat-and-girth harness .  One line was developed as a refinement of that harness and involved a wide variety of martingale and breastplate type straps in front of the shoulder and between the forelegs, all attached to a saddle and girth.  This line is documented in Byzantium in the 10th century and Khmer in the 12th century, and occurs today in Japanese plough harnesses and Indian tongas.  The other line, far more successful, evolved in China from ancient withers-straps that originally were used with a breastplate-and-breeching harness without a girth.  This was the Han departure from the throat-and-girth harness.  A minority of 2nd century Han art shows this new breastplate-and-breeching harness with a girth added to it, and in that context ancient Chinese texts sometimes refer to the withers-strap as a saddle.  This 2nd century harness saddle supported one of two arches attached to shafts, and had terrets through which the reins were carried. The other arch resembles the shaft bow that is in use today in Finland and Russia.

A horse wearing a shaft bow also commonly wears a collar and a saddle.  In a troika, only the center horse wears a saddle.  The side horses may wear collars, breastplate-and-breeching, or surcingles.  An example from 1912 shows a team of three horses in Russia, all wearing collars, the center horse wearing a shaft bow and harness saddle.

References

Horse harness